Arthur Johnston (16 March 1863 – 8 August 1929) was an English cricketer. He played for Middlesex between 1886 and 1887 and for Essex between 1890 and 1896.

References

External links

1863 births
1929 deaths
English cricketers
Essex cricketers
Middlesex cricketers
People from Hornsey
Cricketers from Greater London